The 65th Hong Kong Macau Interport was held in Hong Kong on 20 June 2009. Hong Kong captured the champion by winning 5-1.

Squads

Hong Kong
 Head coach: Goran Paulić
 Assistant coach: Yan Lik Kin
 Fitness coach: Lee Ping Hung
 Goalkeeper coach: Chu Kwok Kuen
 Physio: Lui Yat Hong
 Assistant: Kwan Kon San

Macau

Results

References

Hong Kong–Macau Interport
Macau
Hong